FC Start may refer to:

 A Soviet football team that featured in The Death Match
 FC Start Ulyanovsk, a Russian football team now known as FC Volga Ulyanovsk 
 IK Start, a Norwegian football team